Pomeroon-Supenaam (Region 2)  is a region of Guyana.
It borders the Atlantic Ocean to the north, the region of Essequibo Islands-West Demerara to the east, the region of Cuyuni-Mazaruni to the south and the region of Barima-Waini to the west. Pomeroon-Supenaam contains the town of Anna Regina and the villages of Charity, Pickersgill, Spring Garden and Suddie. In 2012, an Official Census by the Government of Guyana listed the population of the Pomeroon-Supenaam Region at 46,810.

There are three lakes on the Essequibo Coast - Capoey, Mainstay and Hot and Cold. Capoey is near Anna Regina. The three lakes symbolize three of the standard elements, with earth being represented by the land.

Population
The Government of Guyana has administered three official censuses since the 1980 administrative reforms, in 1980, 1991 and 2002.  In 2002, the population of Pomeroon-Supenaam was recorded at 49,253 people. Official census records for the population of the Pomeroon-Supenaam region are as follows:

2012 : 46,810
2002 : 49,253
1991 : 43,455
1980 : 42,341

Communities
(including name variants):

Aberdeen
Abrams Zuil
Adventure
Affiance
Akawini Mission
Amazon
Andrews
Anna Regina
Annandale
Aurora
Bethany
Better Hope
Better Success
Bounty Hall
Bush Lot
Capoey
Charity
Columbia
Cullen
Danielstown
Dartmouth
Devonshire Castle
Dryshore
Fair Field
Fear Not
Golden Fleece (Golden Fleece Plantation)
Hackney
Hampton Court
Henrietta
Hibernia
Huis'T Dieren 
Jacklow
Johanna Cecilia
Kabakaburi
La Belle Alliance
Land of Plenty
Lima Sands
Mainstay/Whyaka
Maria's Lodge
Middlesex
Onderneeming
Perseverance
Perth
Pomona
Queenstown
Reliance
Richmond
Saint Nicholas (Saint Nicholas Mission)
Sirikie
Somerset and Berks
Sparta
Spring Garden
St. Monica Karawab
Suddie
Supenaam
Taymouth Manor
Three Friends
Wakapau Village
Walton Hall
Windsor Castle
Zorg

Gallery

Notable people

See also

References

 
Regions of Guyana